Roselyn Tso is an American government official serving as the director of the Indian Health Service.

Early life and education 
Tso is an enrolled member of the Navajo Nation. She earned a Bachelor of Arts degree in interdisciplinary studies from Marylhurst University and a Master of Science in organizational management from the University of Phoenix.

Career 
Tso joined the Indian Health Service in 1984, serving in Portland, Oregon, and at the agency's headquarters in Rockville, Maryland. She has since served as area director of the Navajo Area Unit of the Indian Health Service.

On September 21, 2022, the U.S. Senate confirmed Tso in a voice vote.

References 

  

Living people
United States Department of Health and Human Services officials
Marylhurst University alumni
University of Phoenix alumni
People from Portland, Oregon
Biden administration personnel
Year of birth missing (living people)